Michael Marum (born 8 October 1973) is a Papua New Guinean rugby league coach and former player who was the first head coach of the Port Moresby-based PNG Hunters in the Queensland Cup and the Papua New Guinea national team. During his playing career, Marum represented Papua New Guinea at the 2000 World Cup. He is the nephew of Skerry Palanga, who coached Papua New Guinea in the 1980s and 1990s.

Playing career
Marum played for the Port Moresby Vipers and then went on to captain, the Agmark Rabaul Guria's and played four tests for Papua New Guinea, including one at the 2000 World Cup.

Coaching career
Some of Marum's earliest coaching roles were as an assistant for the PNG national side at the 2008 World Cup and 2010 Four Nations. His first head coach role was with the Agmark Gurias in the PNG domestic competition in 2012.

Marum has also served as the competition director to the local Agmark nines tournament.

He coached Papua New Guinea rugby league nines side at the 2015 Pacific Games.

In 2016 Marum was appointed head coach of the 13-aside Papua New Guinea national rugby league team after Mal Meninga left to coach Australia. He is PNG's 12th National Coach and 4th former PNG Kumuls player after John Wagambie, Stanley Gene, Adrian Lam to become coach of the Kumuls.

Political career
At the 2022 General Election, Marum was elected governor and MP for the province of East New Britain.

References

1973 births
Living people
Governors of East New Britain Province
Papua New Guinea national rugby league team coaches
Papua New Guinea national rugby league team players
Papua New Guinean rugby league administrators
Papua New Guinean rugby league coaches
Papua New Guinean rugby league players
Place of birth missing (living people)
Rugby league hookers
Members of the National Parliament of Papua New Guinea